The 2018 Roller Hockey Asia Cup was the 18th edition of this tournament, played in Namwon, South Korea between 7 and 13 September 2018. Australia conquered their first title ever.

This tournament served as qualifier for the 2019 Roller Hockey World Cup, by giving only one place in the Intercontinental Championship, second tier, by and five for the Challenger Championship.

Standings

References

External links
World Skate
 India Federation of Roller Sports
 South Korean Federation of Roller Sports
 Japan Roller Sports Federation
 Hóquei Macau

Asian Championship
Roller hockey competitions
Asian Roller Hockey Championship, 2018
2018 in Asian sport
International roller hockey competitions hosted by China